Tmesisternus latifascia is a species of beetle in the family Cerambycidae. It was described by Karl Borromaeus Maria Josef Heller in 1914. It is known from Papua New Guinea.

References

latifascia
Beetles described in 1914